Edward Farrell "Ed" Feighan (born October 22, 1947) is a former American politician. He served as a member of the Ohio House of Representatives, and as a Democratic Party U.S. Representative from 1983 to 1993, serving Ohio's 19th congressional district.

Early life and education
Feighan was born in Lakewood, Ohio. He graduated in 1965 from St. Edward High School, an all-boys Catholic high school on Cleveland's west side.  In 1969, he earned a Bachelor of Arts from Loyola University in New Orleans, LA. He attended Cleveland State University College of Law at Cleveland State University while serving in the legislature and received his Juris Doctor in 1978.

Political career
Feighan was first elected to public office as a State Representative from Cleveland, Ohio, in 1972. He served for six years in the Ohio Legislature until his election as a Cuyahoga County Commissioner, a position he held for four years.

In 1977, Feighan ran for mayor of the city of Cleveland, but lost a narrow race to Dennis Kucinich, who also later became a member of Congress.

He was not a candidate for renomination in 1992 to the 103rd Congress, presumably due to his involvement in the House banking scandal and the specter of a primary fight against incumbent Mary Rose Oakar because of redistricting.

After politics
Feighan served as a director of ProCentury Corporation, a Westerville-based specialty insurance company, and its insurance subsidiaries from 1993 to 1996.

From November 1997 until August 1998, he was a Senior Vice President of Century Business Services, a Cleveland-based provider of outsourced business services now known as CBIZ.

From 1998 until 2000, Feighan was the president of Avalon National Corporation, a holding company for a workers’ compensation insurance agency. During that span, he was also a Managing Partner of Alliance Financial, Ltd., a merchant banking firm specializing in mergers and acquisitions from September 1998 until May 2003.

In 2000, he once again became director of ProCentury, for which he had been the on-and-off Special Counsel. In October 2003, Feighan became the chairman, president and CEO of ProCentury. However, he resigned on July 31, 2008, when it was sold to Meadowbrook Insurance Group.

Since February 2014, Feighan has served as the CEO of Covius, a commercial and residential real estate advisory services company.

Electoral history

See also
 List of United States representatives from Ohio

References

External links
 
 The Political Graveyard profile
 

1947 births
Living people
Cleveland–Marshall College of Law alumni
Loyola University New Orleans alumni
St. Edward High School (Lakewood, Ohio) alumni
County commissioners in Ohio
Democratic Party members of the Ohio House of Representatives
People from Lakewood, Ohio
Democratic Party members of the United States House of Representatives from Ohio
20th-century American politicians